The Higher Secondary School for Boys, Srirangam is a secondary school located in, Srirangam, Tiruchirapalli, Tamil Nadu, India.

History

The school was founded by V. Veeraraghavachari in 1896. The headmasters of the school were M. C. Rajagopla Naidu, S. R. Sinivasa Iyengar, S. K. Mathru Bootham,  K. N. Rangaswamy Iyer, Dharmaiah, K. Parthasarathy Iyengar, S. V. Srinivasa Iyengar, N. R. Narasimhan, A. K. Rangarajan, Sampath Kumar, S. Sankara Narayanan, R. Varadarajan, V. Ramanujam and R. Chandrasekar, K. Venkatesh

Notable alumni
Sujatha, writer
Vaali, poet
Gopala Ramanujam, Governor for Goa

References 

Boys' schools in India
High schools and secondary schools in Tamil Nadu
Schools in Tiruchirappalli
Educational institutions established in 1896
1896 establishments in India